Stilbene may refer to one of the two stereoisomers of 1,2-diphenylethene:

 (E)-Stilbene (trans isomer)
 (Z)-Stilbene (cis isomer)

See also
 Stilbenoids, a class of molecules found in plants
 1,1-Diphenylethylene